WAB or Wab may refer to:

 Wab language, an Austronesian language
 Wab Kinew (born 1981), Canadian politician
 Wabash Railroad
 Warhammer Ancient Battles, a tabletop wargame
 Weebl and Bob
 Weekend at Bernie's, 1989 film
 Wengernalpbahn railway in Switzerland
 Werkverzeichnis Anton Bruckner, a catalogue of Anton Bruckner's works edited by Renate Grasberger
 Western Academy of Beijing, an international school in Beijing, China
 Western Aphasia Battery
 Windows Address Book
 Warwickshire Association for the Blind
 European Union (Withdrawal Agreement) Bill 2017–19
 Workers' Aid for Bosnia
 "W.A.B" (an acronym of Weak-Ass Bitch), a song by Megan Thee Stallion from her mixtape Fever